Ikuyo Namura (born May 13, 1969) is a Japanese former volleyball player who competed in the 1992 Summer Olympics.

In 1992 she finished fifth with the Japanese team in the Olympic tournament.

External links
 sports-reference.com

1969 births
Living people
Japanese women's volleyball players
Olympic volleyball players of Japan
Volleyball players at the 1992 Summer Olympics